The 2021–22 Central Michigan Chippewas men's basketball team represented Central Michigan University in the 2021–22 NCAA Division I men's basketball season. The Chippewas, led by new head coach Tony Barbee, played their home games at McGuirk Arena in Mount Pleasant, Michigan as members of the Mid-American Conference.

Previous season
The Chippewas finished the finished the season 7–16, 3–13 in MAC play to finish in 11th place. They failed to qualify for the MAC tournament.

Following the season, fired head coach, Keno Davis, after nine years.

Offseason

Departures

Incoming transfers

2021 recruiting class

Roster

Schedule and results 

|-
!colspan=12 style=| Exhibition

|-
!colspan=12 style=| Non-conference regular season

|-
!colspan=12 style=| MAC regular season

|-
!colspan=9 style=| MAC tournament

Sources

References

Central Michigan Chippewas men's basketball seasons
Central Michigan Chippewas
Central Michigan Chippewas men's basketball
Central Michigan Chippewas men's basketball